Matthias Goossen (born October 14, 1992) is a former Canadian gridiron football centre who last played for the Winnipeg Blue Bombers of the Canadian Football League. Prior to being drafted into the CFL, he played college football for the Simon Fraser Clan.

College career
As a freshman at Simon Fraser, Goossen was part of Clan's inaugural season in the NCAA. He served as a captain in his last two years of college, and was named a first-team GNAC all star three times.

Professional career
Goossen was selected in the first round of the 2014 CFL Draft, second overall, by the Winnipeg Blue Bombers. He signed a three-year contract with the Bombers on May 28. On January 29, 2019, he announced his retirement from professional football, as he was about to enter free agency the following month. Goossen planned to become an officer with his local police department in Vancouver, BC.

References

External links 

Winnipeg Blue Bombers bio 
Matthias Goossen gets his chance to shine at centre for Bombers Saturday

1992 births
Living people
Players of Canadian football from British Columbia
Canadian football offensive linemen